Kota Sarang Semut is a small town in Yan District, Kedah, Malaysia. It is located near at km 16 along Alor Star–Gurun main trunk road Federal Route 1 at a junction to Pendang town.

The name of the town literally translated means City of Anthills. A story goes that when King Solomon passed by this place with an entourage of men and elephants. The ants, fearing that the stampede will destroy their home, cried for mercy and it was heard by Solomon. He then warned off his company not to step on the anthills.

Today, the main federal road cuts through the quiet town from Gurun to Alor Setar. The Wan Mat Saman Aqueduct, a historical canal channelling water to the paddy fields in Kedah since colonial days also passes through the town centre.

The construction of the North–South Expressway made this town less known and visited except for those who still prefer travelling the old way. To compensate for the loss, however, the expressway puts the town on a signboard marking the nearest exit (175).

See also
North–South Expressway

References

Towns in Kedah
Yan District